The 1892 French Rugby Championship was the inaugural annual French rugby union championship organised on 20 March 1892 by the USFSA, a one off game between Racing Club de France and Stade Français. The game was refereed by Pierre de Coubertin and saw Racing win 4–3. Racing were awarded the Bouclier de Brennus, which continues to be awarded to the winners of the Top 14. The trophy was the idea of de Coubertin who commissioned Charles Brennus, a member of the USFSA and a professional engraver, to design it.

Results

External links
 Compte rendu de la finale de 1892, at lnr.fr

Notes and references 

1892
France
Championship
Racing 92 matches
Stade Français matches